RoundGlass Punjab FC is an Indian professional football club based in Mohali, Punjab, founded in 2005 as Minerva Academy FC. After being promoted into the I-League in 2016, the academy based club was rebranded to Minerva Punjab FC and in 2019, football section of the club was relabeled as Punjab FC. In April 2020, RoundGlass Sports Pvt Ltd completed acquisition of the club and rebranded as RoundGlass Punjab FC. Since inception, the club has won I-League title twice, in 2017–18 as top tier, 2022–23 as second tier.

History
The team was established in 2005 as Minerva Academy, and has both the football and cricket sections. Initially, the team took part in its first major tournament at the national level, the I-League 2nd Division, and were the runners up for the season. They lost to five-time I-League champions Dempo SC in the final. They were promoted to I-League after an impressive stint at the 2nd Division. They finished their first-ever 2016–17 I-League season at the second last position. They also participated in the 2016 Durand Cup. They came last in the group stage and hence couldn't qualify for the semi-finals.

Next season, surprising everyone, they won the I-League title, which was their first league win ever in top division. They became first ones from North India to win the league since 1996. This title made the team qualify for their first-ever Asian stint. The club qualified for Group stage of the 2019 AFC Cup, along with Indian Super League side Chennaiyin, starting from Preliminary Round 2. However, they lost to Iranian side Saipa in the preliminary round of 2019 AFC Champions League and therefore couldn't make it to the play-offs. But, in their AFC Cup stint, they impressed with unbeaten run of five games until the last group fixture, which they lost against Abahani Limited Dhaka. Minerva were also placed in the round of 16 bracket of 2018 Indian Super Cup in which they lost to Jamshedpur 4–5 on penalties.

In 2018–19 I-League, the club managed to win four of their twenty fixtures and finished ninth in the league table. They were placed in 2019 Indian Super Cup qualifying round, but refused to play protesting against uncertainty of I-League clubs' future in Indian football. Thereafter, they were also not invited to play 2019 Durand Cup, which was disappointing for the Punjabi side.

On 30 October 2019, announcement was made that after a partnership agreement with RoundGlass Sports Private Ltd. the club has been renamed as Punjab Football Club.

Ahead of the 2020–21 I-League season, RoundGlass Sports completed acquisition of Punjab FC and rebranded the club to RoundGlass Punjab Football Club. On 15 June 2020, they appointed Curtis Fleming as their head coach. On 15 July, they appointed Nikolaos Topoliatis as new technical director. As the season progressed, Punjab made it to the championship stage and finished their season with a 2–3 loss to Churchill Brothers. They achieved 2nd position with 22 points in 15 league matches.

In August 2022, Staikos Vergetis was appointed as new head coach of RoundGlass Punjab. After winning 4–0 against Rajasthan United on 4 March 2023, the club ensued their second I-League win, and gaining promotion to Indian Super League for first time. They ended the season with 52 points in 22 league matches.

Stadiums

RoundGlass Punjab currently using Tau Devi Lal Stadium of Panchkula, as their home ground. The stadium has a capacity of 12,000 spectators. The club previously used Guru Nanak Stadium for their home matches, but only for one season.

The club during I-League Second Division, used Sector 17 Ground Stadium in Chandigarh, as home ground. When Minerva entered into AFC Cup, they used various stadiums which could fit the competitions standards. During the group stage, club played two matches at the Indira Gandhi Athletic Stadium in Guwahati, and another at the Kalinga Stadium in Bhubaneswar.

Supporters
A recognised fan club named "The Warriors", has been in support since 2018. The Guru Nanak Stadium has seen an average attendance of 12,000.

Kit manufacturers and shirt sponsors

Players

First-team squad

Personnel

Current technical staff

Team records

Season-by-season

Key
Attendance = Average league attendance

Overall records

Continental statistics

Managerial record

Notable players

The following RoundGlass Punjab players have been capped at full international level. Years in brackets indicate their spells at the club.

  Ivan Filatov (2017)
  Palsang Lama (2017–2018)
  Chencho Gyeltshen (2017–2018, 2020–2021, 2023–)
  Aimable Nsabimana (2018)
  Papa Niang (2018)
  Kiran Chemjong (2018, 2019–2020, 2022–)
  Mahmoud Amnah (2019)
  Cornelius Stewart (2019)
  Robert Primus (2019)
  Ali Ashfaq (2019)
  Teah Dennis Jr. (2019–2020)
  Kurtis Guthrie (2021–2022)
  Adnan Šećerović (2022–2023)

Honours

League
I-League (as tier I)
Champions (1): 2017–18 
Third place (1): 2019–20
I-League (as tier II)
Champions (1): 2022–23
I-League 2nd Division
Runners-up (1): 2015–16
Punjab Super League
Champions (3): 2018, 2019, 2022–23

Cup
 J&K Invitational Cup
Winners (1): 2018 
 Bodousa Cup
Runners-up (1): 2019

Other department(s)

Youth

Club's youth section was incorporated as Minerva Punjab FC (Youth) to participate in various age-group competitions of the Hero Youth League, in which they clinched multiple titles.

Honours

 Youth League U18
Champions (1): 2018–19
 JSW U-18 Youth Cup
Winners (1): 2022
 Youth League U-15
Champions (4): 2015–16, 2016–17, 2017–18, 2018–19
Youth I-league
Champions (1): 2017–18
 JSW U-13 Youth Cup
Winners (1): 2022
KBN Youth Cup
Winners (1): 2022

See also

 List of football clubs in India

References

Footnotes

Further reading

External links
 RoundGlass Punjab official website

Team profile at the-aiff.com. (AIFF)
Team archive at Arunava about Football

RoundGlass Punjab FC
I-League clubs
I-League 2nd Division clubs
Football clubs in Punjab, India
Association football clubs established in 2005
2005 establishments in India